An executive head teacher, executive head master, executive head mistress, executive head or executive principal is the substantive or strategic head teacher of more than one school in the United Kingdom.

The position role of an executive head teacher usually comes in one of three forms: The appointed executive head is responsible for the management of more than one school. They remain the head teacher of their current school, but also become the strategic leader of one or more other schools. The executive head has no substantive headship in any school but remains the strategic leader of a chain, federation or collaboration of schools. In the case of the third option, the executive head teacher is above the head teachers appointed to manage each individual school within the consortium.

The role of executive heads was first introduced in 2004 when in 1996 the then Prime Minister Tony Blair announced that a new policy would allow head teachers who had been classed as outstanding to take over the leadership of schools who had been designated by local authorities as failing. The idea put forward that once the standards in those failing schools had improved, a new head teacher could take over. Today however the role and idea of and executive head teacher has expanded, with many staying in place within a system leadership role rather than specific headship roles; working with a number of head teachers.

See also
Head teacher
Deputy head teacher
Superintendent (education)

References

External links
 National Governance Association - Executive Headteachers

Education and training occupations
Academic administrators
Positions of authority